Tecnu is an over-the-counter skin cleanser manufactured by Tec Laboratories, a pharmaceutical company based in Albany, Oregon. It is intended for use by humans and furry pets after topical exposure to urushiol, the active ingredient in poison oak, poison ivy, and poison sumac.  Tecnu is made from deodorized mineral spirits, water, propylene glycol, octylphenoxy-polythoxethanol, mixed fatty acid soap, and fragrance.

History
The cleanser was invented by former Mead Johnson executive and chemist Dr. Robert Smith during the early 1960s. Tecnu, for "Technically New," was intended to remove radioactive fallout dust from skin. Several years later, his wife discovered another use for the cleanser. After an exposure to poison oak, she washed with Tecnu and did not get urushiol-induced contact dermatitis.

In 1977, the company began to market Tecnu to foresters, firefighters, surveyors, and utility crews. It has since become a popular remedy for gardeners and others who live and work around poison ivy.

Effectiveness
Tecnu's effectiveness for postexposure treatment has been confirmed in a nonrandomized study, in which the authors concluded: "Our study showed 70%, 61.8%, and 56.4% protection with Tecnu, Goop, and Dial, respectively, when compared to the positive control, or to the possible maximum response, with a cost per ounce (in a local drug and automotive store) of $1.25, $0.07, and $0.07, respectively, for a decrease in protection that is nonsignificant."  A survey article is also available.

References

External links
Product Description From Tec Labs
What Is Zeitgard 1 Cleansing Brush?

Skin care brands
Companies based in Albany, Oregon